Trail of Bones might refer to:

 The southern route of the Silk Road that traversed the Karakoram Pass.
 Trail Of Bones: More Cases From The Files Of A Forensic Anthropologist, a book by American anthropologist Mary H. Manheim.
 "Trail of Bones", one of the novels in the Danger Boy series written by Mark London Williams.